Christian Mayer may refer to:

Christian Mayer (astronomer) (1719–1783), Czech astronomer and teacher
Christian Mayer (skier) (born 1972), Austrian former alpine skier
Christian Mayer (Wisconsin politician) (1827–1910), Wisconsin manufacturer, mayor and legislator
Christian Gustav Adolph Mayer (1839–1907), German mathematician
Christian Ludwig Mayer (born 1974), German pianist and composer

See also
C. Mayer (crater), named for the astronomer
 Christian Meyer (disambiguation)
 Christian Meier (disambiguation)